"Anything" is a song recorded by Canadian pop rock band Hedley for their fifth studio album, Wild Life (2013). The song was written and produced by Jacob Hoggard and Brian Howes, with additional writing by Jason Van Poederooyen. It was released to Canadian radio on August 19, 2013 through Universal Music Canada as the album's lead single. "Anything" was serviced to alternative radio in the US through Capitol Records in November 2013 as the band's fifth American single.

Upon release, "Anything" was met with mixed reviews from music critics, but performed well commercially. The song peaked at number 5 on the Canadian Hot 100 and reached the top 10 on three national airplay charts. It also charted at 18 in New Zealand. In September 2016, "Anything" was certified 4× Platinum by Music Canada, making it the band's best-selling single to date.

Composition

"Anything" is an upbeat pop song with a duration of three minutes and eleven seconds. It is composed in the key of G and set to a BPM of 76. Its lyrics convey a message of defiance and believing that one can do anything they set their mind to, regardless what people may tell them or expect of them. With its anthemic nature, "Anything" expands upon themes found in previous Hedley singles including "Invincible" and "One Life". Lead singer and co-writer Jacob Hoggard explained that the song is, to him, about finding the strength to rise above life's hardships.

Critical reception
Emma Garland at Alter The Press! gave the song a mixed review, feeling that although "Anything" is "insanely catchy", the "uh-uh, fuck that" hook is "awkward" and "quickly gets irritating". Philip Lickley at UK music blog All-Noise described the song as "a stadium-friendly chanting song... with a strong message" that "screams out for radio play", and rated it a 7 out of 10.

Music video
The music video for "Anything" was directed by JP Poliquin and was shot at The Great Hall in Toronto, Ontario. It premiered on the band's VEVO channel on September 10, 2013.

Awards and nominations

Track listings

Charts and certifications

Weekly charts

Certifications

Year-end charts

Release history

References

2013 songs
2013 singles
Hedley (band) songs
Universal Music Group singles
Capitol Records singles
Songs written by Jacob Hoggard
Songs written by Brian Howes